Anne Päivi Aulikki Huotari (born 31 December 1959 in Vaala, Finland) is a Finnish politician. She was a member of the Parliament of Finland from 1995 to 2007, representing the Left Alliance. Afterwards she has served on the Oulu city council.

References

1959 births
Living people
People from Vaala
Left Alliance (Finland) politicians
Members of the Parliament of Finland (1995–99)
Members of the Parliament of Finland (1999–2003)
Members of the Parliament of Finland (2003–07)
Women members of the Parliament of Finland
21st-century Finnish women politicians